The real was the currency of Argentina until 1881. From 1822, it was subdivided into 10 décimos. The sol was also issued during this period and was equal to the real, whilst the peso was worth 8 reales and the escudo was worth 16 reales.

History
Spanish colonial reales circulated alone until 1813, when Argentina began issuing its own coins. From 1820, paper money was also issued. In 1826, the peso moneda corriente and peso fuerte were introduced in paper money only. In 1854, coins were issued denominated in centavos. However, decimalization did not occur until in 1881, when the real was replaced by the peso moneda nacional at a rate of 8 reales to 1 peso.

Coins

The state of Buenos Aires issued its own coins starting in 1822, denominated in reales and décimos, with 10 décimos = 1 real.
They were all minted of copper. Other provinces issued coins denominated in reales (silver) and escudos (gold): Córdoba, Entre Ríos, La Rioja, Mendoza, Salta, Santiago del Estero and Tucumán. Since these coins were scarce, it was common to use silver coins from other countries (especially Bolivian soles).

In 1854, coins were issued in the name of the "Argentine Confederation" in denominations of 1, 2 and 4 centavo coins. As notes above, this issue did not lead to full decimalization.

Banknotes
In 1820, the Government of the Province of Buenos Aires introduced notes in denominations of 5, 10, 20, 40, 50 and 100 pesos. These were followed in 1823 by 1, 3 and 5 pesos. The Banco de Buenos Ayres began issuing notes in 1822 in denominations of 20, 50, 100, 200, 500 and 1000 pesos. 1 and 2 peso notes followed in 1823.

General references 
 
 

Currencies of Argentina
Modern obsolete currencies
Sun on coins